The Key That Should Not Be Handed On is a 1976 Soviet drama film directed by Dinara Asanova.

Plot 
Kirill Alekseevich after serving in the army became a school director. It is very difficult for him to get used to the hustle and bustle of school life and get along with children and colleagues.

Cast 
 Elena Proklova as Marina Maksimovna
 Aleksey Petrenko as Kirill Alexeyevich
 Lidiya Fedoseeva-Shukshina as Emma Pavlovna
 Lyubov Malinovskaya as Olga Denisovna
 Zinoviy Gerdt as Oleg Trigorievich
 Yekaterina Vasilyeva as Klavdiya Petrovna Bayushkina
 Oleg Khromenkov as Bayushkin
 Anvar Asanov as Anton
 Marina Levtova as Yulya Bayushkina
 Aleksandr Bogdanov as Sasha Maydanov

References

External links 
 

1976 films
1970s Russian-language films
Soviet drama films
1976 drama films
Soviet teen films